Diradops is a genus of parasitoid wasps belonging to the family Ichneumonidae. Diradops contains at least 35 species.

References

Ichneumonidae
Ichneumonidae genera